Faux is a railway station in Faux, Court-Saint-Étienne, Walloon Brabant, Belgium. It opened in 1901 on the Line 140 (Ottignies - Fleurus - Charleroi).

Location 
The railway station is located in Faux, Court-Saint-Étienne, Walloon Brabant, Belgium. Faux station is located at kilometric point 7.30 on line 140, from Ottignies to Marcinelle (Charleroi), between the stations of Court-Saint-Étienne and La Roche.

History
The Belgian State Railways Administration put the stopping point of Faux into service on 1 August 1901. It was originally a simple stopping point depending on the station of La Roche.

In 1909, this stopping point became a full stop; a building, equipped with a counter and facilities for unloading parcels and goods, was built at this time.

Faux became an unmanned stopping point again in 1964. The station building has since been demolished.

Service
Faux is served by SNCB Suburban (S61), Heure de pointe  ("Rush Hour") (P) and Tourist ("Touristiques") (ICT) trains moving on line 140 (Charleroi-Sud - Ottignies).

During the week, the service includes:

 S61 trains between Namur or Jambes and Ottignies via Charleroi-Sud (every hour); every day, three trains are extended toward Wavre or Basse-Wavre;
 Three additional S61 trains between Charleroi-Sud and Ottignies (in the morning);
 Three additional S61 trains between Ottignies and Charleroi-Sud (late afternoon).
 On weekends and public holidays, the service consists of S61 trains between Namur and Ottignies via Charleroi-Sud (every two hours).

During holidays, a single ICT train connects Charleroi-Sud to Bierges-Walibi and Wavre, in the morning, with a return trip in the evening.

References

External links
 Faux railway station at SNCB

Railway stations in Belgium
Railway stations opened in 1901
Railway stations in Walloon Brabant
Court-Saint-Étienne